The 1947–48 season was the 64th Scottish football season in which Dumbarton competed at national level, entering the Scottish Football League, the Scottish Cup, the Scottish League Cup and the Supplementary Cup.  In addition, Dumbarton competed in the Stirlingshire Cup.

Scottish Football League

A poor start, which saw only one point taken from the first 5 league games, meant that any hopes of challenging for promotion were quickly dashed and eventually Dumbarton finished 11th out of 16 with 25 points - 28 behind champions East Fife.

League Cup

The League Cup saw Dumbarton again struggle to progress from their section, finishing 3rd of 4, with just 2 wins and a draw from their 6 games.

Scottish Cup

After negotiating a tricky trip to the Highlands, Dumbarton were defeated by high flying Division B opponents East Fife in the third round.

Supplementary Cup
As in the Scottish Cup, Dumbarton again came up against East Fife, and the outcome was the same, with the Fifers progressing to the semi final.

Stirlingshire Cup
Dumbarton lost to Division A Falkirk in the semi final.

Benefit Match

Player statistics

|}

Source:

Transfers

Players in

Players out 

Source:

Reserve team
Dumbarton entered the Scottish Second XI Cup but lost in the first round to Ayr United.

References

Dumbarton F.C. seasons
Scottish football clubs 1947–48 season